This is a round-up of the 1988 Sligo Senior Football Championship. St. Patrick's, Dromard regained the Owen B. Hunt Cup after a fourteen-year wait, and it was a hard-earned title, having defeated the two leading lights of the 1980s - holders St. Mary's and Tubbercurry. St. Mary's were seen off emphatically after a quarter-final replay, bringing the curtain down on a remarkable era for the Sligo town club, and the Dromard side defeated Tubbercurry by a single point in the final.

First round

Quarter finals

Semi-finals

Sligo Senior Football Championship Final

References

 Sligo Champion (July–September 1988)

Sligo Senior Football Championship
Sligo Senior Football Championship